The Venediger Group is a mountain range of the Central Eastern Alps. Together with the Granatspitze Group, the Glockner Group, the Goldberg Group, and the Ankogel Group, it forms the main ridge  of the High Tauern. Considerable parts of the Venediger Group belong to the core zone of the High Tauern National Park.

Geography 

The Venediger Group is located in Austria in the federal states of Salzburg and Tyrol, and also in Italy in the autonomous province of South Tyrol. The greater part of the range lies in East Tyrol. 

The Venediger Group includes the western part of the main chain of the High Tauern range. The Felber Tauern pass road runs across the Alpine crest between Salzburg and East Tyrol on the eastern side of the range. The Venediger Group is the most glaciated mountain range in the High Tauern. The renown of the main summit in the group, the Großvenediger, rather overshadows the other regions and mountains, though the group has a great number of peaks, mountain paths and Alpine huts. 

The origin of its name is unclear. According to a legend, when local shepherds saw the giant mass of the Venediger glacier for the first time they thought they were looking at the glistening surface of the sea with a town (“Venice”). Nevertheless, the name may go back to medieval Welsh (Venetian) prospectors searching for Cobalt and Manganese ores in the area.

Neighbouring ranges 
The Venediger Group borders on the following other ranges in the Alps:
 Kitzbühel Alps (to the north)
 Granatspitze Group (to the east)
 Villgraten Mountains (to the south)
 Rieserferner Group (to the southwest)
 Zillertal Alps (to the west)

Boundaries 

To the north the Oberpinzgau valley of the Salzach river forms the boundary from Krimml downstream to the town of Mittersill. To the east the boundary runs from Mittersill southwards up the Felberbach stream, over the Felber Tauern pass and continues down the Tauernbach to Matrei in Osttirol. From there it continues southwards along the Isel river to the village of Huben (part of the Matrei municipality). To the south the Defereggen Valley delineates the boundary from Huben along the Schwarzach heading upstream as far as the Jagdhaus alp and the Klammljoch pass. From the Klammljoch it runs downhill along the Klammlbach and through the South Tyrolean Rein valley to Sand in Taufers. In the west its perimeter runs along the Tauferer Ahrntal valley from Sand in Taufers up to Birnlücke Pass and down the Krimmler Ache to Krimml in the Salzach valley.

The Birnlücke links the Venediger Group with the Zillertal Alps. The Klammljoch is its junction with the Rieserferner Group. The Felber Tauern join the Venediger Group to the  Granatspitze Group.

Whilst clearly defined side ridges regularly branch off northwards from the main chain of the Venediger Group, towards the south the mountain tend to sprawl over a larger area forming their own subgroups: the Durreck Group, the Panargenkamm and the Lasörling Group. Located between the heavily glaciated main crest and the Lasörling Group west of Matrei, the Virgen valley the only permanently settled valley within the Venediger Group.

Peaks 
All the named three-thousanders in the Venediger Group:

Tourism 
The Venediger Group is well developed for tourism. In addition to a myriad managed Alpine pastures and restaurants there is also a large number of Alpine Club huts:

References

External links 

 
Mountain ranges of the Alps
Hohe Tauern
Mountain ranges of Salzburg (state)
Mountain ranges of Trentino-South Tyrol
Mountain ranges of Tyrol (state)
Geography of East Tyrol
Mountain ranges of South Tyrol
Rieserferner-Ahrn Nature Park
Zell am See District